S-Adenosylmethionine:tRNA ribosyltransferase-isomerase (QueA enzyme, queuosine biosynthesis protein QueA) is an enzyme with systematic name S-adenosyl-L-methionine:7-aminomethyl-7-deazaguanosine ribosyltransferase (ribosyl isomerizing; L-methionine, adenine releasing). This enzyme catalyses the following chemical reaction

 S-adenosyl-L-methionine + 7-aminomethyl-7-carbaguanosine34 in tRNA  L-methionine + adenine + epoxyqueuosine34 in tRNA

The reaction is a combined transfer and isomerization of the ribose moiety of S-adenosyl-L-methionine to the modified guanosine base in the wobble position in tRNAs specific for Tyr, His, Asp or Asn.

References

External links 

EC 2.4.99